The Independent Presbyterian Church is a Presbyterian Church in America megachurch in Memphis, Tennessee, with over 2,000 members.

History 

The Independent Presbyterian Church of Memphis, Tennessee, Inc., was incorporated on March 17, 1965. The church met at the Plaza Theatre on Poplar Avenue for a little more than the first two years of its existence. The Reverend Leonard T. Van Horn served as the church's first pastor. In May 1968, the Reverend James E. Moore was hired to serve as the senior minister. By this time, the church had moved to its current location on Walnut Grove Road. During Jim Moore's tenure, the church began a ministry with Palmer Home for Children. In July 1974, the Reverend Robert C. Laman became senior minister. Robert Laman and Louis Powell, a deacon, added a Wednesday evening family dinner and Bible study to supplement its Sunday services. The Reverend John P. Sartelle Sr. began his service as senior minister of the church in November 1977. Under his leadership, a College and Career ministry began, the church's membership grew to 2,200, and construction commenced to include an expanded sanctuary, a large fellowship hall, educational and office space, and a gymnasium. As the church grew, so did its staff and ministries. Its ministries include those for children, youth, women, senior adults, music, and missions. In the year 2000, the church's congregation voted to join the Presbyterian Church in America (PCA) after 35 years of congregationalism. In 2006, Dr. John Hardie was called upon to serve as senior minister and in 2009, the Reverend Richie Sessions became the sixth senior minister to lead the church. Since January 2017, Dr. Sean Michael Lucas has been the senior pastor at Independent Presbyterian Church.

Theology 
As a PCA church it confesses 1) Total depravity of man. Man is completely incapable within himself to reach out towards God. Man is totally at enmity with God, cf. Romans 3:10-23. (2) Unconditional election by the grace of God. There is absolutely no condition in any person for which God would save him. As a matter of fact, long before man was created, God chose or predestined some to everlasting life. He did this out of His mere good pleasure, cf. Ephesians 1:4 and 5. (3) Particular atonement. God in His infinite mercy, in order to accomplish the planned redemption, sent His own Son, Jesus Christ, to die as a substitute for the sins of a large but specific number of people, cf. Romans 8:29 and 30. (4) The irresistible grace of God. This is the effectual work of the Holy Spirit moving upon a particular person whom He has called, applying the work of redemption, cf. John 3:5 and 6. (5) The perseverance of the saints. This is that gracious work of God's sanctification whereby He enables a saved person to persevere to the end. Even though the process of sanctification is not complete in this life, from God's perspective it is as good as accomplished,

IPC affirms the Westminster Confession of Faith.

IPC is a conservative church which adheres to the five points of reformation
Faith Alone
Grace Alone
Christ Alone 
The Glory of God Alone
Scripture Alone

Missions
The church is involved with several outreach mission works home and abroad. Primary target areas are Memphis, the Mid-South, Miami, Western United States, the United Kingdom, Germany, Colombia, Greece, Rwanda, and various regions in the 1040 Window.

References

External links
Independent Presbyterian Church in Memphis

Presbyterian Church in America churches in Tennessee
Churches in Memphis, Tennessee